Vasko Kalezić (born 14 March 1994) is a Montenegrin professional footballer who plays as a midfielder.

Club career
After success in qualifying for the UEFA Europa League with OFK Titograd, Kalezić joined Norwegian First Division club Hønefoss BK in winter of 2014, signing a two-year-contract. In March 2015 he was loaned to fellow league club Bærum SK until August 2015.

After Baerum, Kalezić returned to Hønefoss, before transferring to Moldovan National Division club FC Dacia Chișinău on 23 January 2016. After a spell with Cypriot side Anagennisi Deryneia FC, Kalezić returned to Montenegro and signed with FK Zeta.

On 29 August 2017, he signed a two-year-deal with Serbian SuperLiga club FK Vojvodina. In 2018, he came back to Titograd, but then, on 31 July 2019 signed with Premier League of Bosnia and Herzegovina club FK Velež Mostar. Kalezić made his official debut for Velež on 17 August 2019, in a 1–0 home league win against NK Široki Brijeg. In December 2019, the club terminated his contract.

On 17 January 2020, Kalezić joined Montenegrin club Budućnost.

On 18 August 2022, his contract with Yverdon was terminated by mutual consent.

International career
Kalezić represented the Montenegro national U21 team in 2014, making 1 appearance for the country but did not score a goal.

He made his national team debut on 7 October 2020 in a friendly against Latvia.

References

External links
 
 
 
 

1994 births
Living people
Footballers from Podgorica
Association football midfielders
Montenegrin footballers
Montenegro under-21 international footballers
Montenegro international footballers
OFK Titograd players
Hønefoss BK players
Bærum SK players
FC Dacia Chișinău players
Anagennisi Deryneia FC players
FK Zeta players
FK Vojvodina players
FK Velež Mostar players
FK Budućnost Podgorica players
Yverdon-Sport FC players
Montenegrin First League players
Norwegian First Division players
Moldovan Super Liga players
Cypriot First Division players
Serbian SuperLiga players
Premier League of Bosnia and Herzegovina players
Swiss Challenge League players
2. Liga Interregional players
Montenegrin expatriate footballers
Expatriate footballers in Norway
Montenegrin expatriate sportspeople in Norway
Expatriate footballers in Moldova
Montenegrin expatriate sportspeople in Moldova
Expatriate footballers in Cyprus
Montenegrin expatriate sportspeople in Cyprus
Expatriate footballers in Serbia
Montenegrin expatriate sportspeople in Serbia
Expatriate footballers in Bosnia and Herzegovina
Montenegrin expatriate sportspeople in Bosnia and Herzegovina
Expatriate footballers in Switzerland
Montenegrin expatriate sportspeople in Switzerland